Kastriot Sabri Peqini (born 19 February 1974) is a retired Albanian professional football who played for KF Elbasani in Albania and Birkirkara FC in Malta.

He became the second youngest player to play for the Albania national team when he made his debut on 29 January 1992 at the age of 17 years and 343 days old, just 12 days older than the youngest ever player Blendi Nallbani.

International career
He made his debut for Albania in a January 1992 friendly match against Greece and earned a total of 11 caps, scoring no goals. His final international was a June 1993 FIFA World Cup qualification match against Denmark.

National team statistics

Personal life
He is the son of former Albania international and Dinamo Tirana legend Sabri Peqini. His own son, Jurgen Peqini, is also a professional footballer.

References

External links

1974 births
Living people
Footballers from Elbasan
Albanian footballers
Association football defenders
Association football midfielders
Albania international footballers
Albania under-21 international footballers
Kategoria Superiore players
KF Elbasani players
Birkirkara F.C. players
Albanian expatriate footballers
Expatriate footballers in Malta
Albanian expatriate sportspeople in Malta